Fabiana Gómez (born 8 December 1986, in Montevideo) is a Uruguayan beach volleyball player and former tennis player.

She is the first Uruguayan along with María Eugenia Nieto to play a Beach Volleyball World Cup.

Results
Pan American Games
 2011: 6th
 2015: TBD

Beach Volleyball World Championships
 2015: 37th

References

External links
 Profile at FIVB
 Profile at Toronto 2015

1986 births
Living people
Uruguayan beach volleyball players
Women's beach volleyball players
Pan American Games competitors for Uruguay
Beach volleyball players at the 2011 Pan American Games
Beach volleyball players at the 2015 Pan American Games
Uruguayan female tennis players